New Hampden is an unincorporated community in Highland County, Virginia, United States. The community is situated on the banks of the South Branch Potomac River west of the northern end of Monterey Mountain and southwest of the community of Blue Grass, Virginia and the Devils Backbone rock outcrop. The community appeared around 1858 and is characterized as having a "regular appearance" in contrast to more haphazardly developed villages. West of New Hampden is the site of a flint quarry used by Native Americans to procure sources of flint for the production of arrowheads. Some accounts state that the area was of such importance that it was considered to be neutral ground by the native tribes.

Located in New Hampden is a historic grist mill that began operations around 1816-1817 and ceased in 1944.  The structure, originally known as the Rexrode Mill, still stands to the present day.

References

Bibliography

Unincorporated communities in Highland County, Virginia
Unincorporated communities in Virginia